Vradenburg is a surname. Notable people with the surname include:

George Vradenburg (born 1943), American lawyer and philanthropist
Trish Vradenburg (1946–2017), American playwright, author, television writer, and advocate, wife of George

See also
Vredenburg (disambiguation)